Abdel Raouf Yagoub Omer Taha (born 18 July 1993), known as just Abdel Raouf, is a Sudanese professional footballer who plays as a midfielder for the Sudanese club Al-Hilal Club, and the Sudan national team.

International career
Raouf made his international debut with the Sudan national team in a 3–2 friendly loss to Ethiopia on 30 December 2021. He was part of the Sudan squad that was called up for the 2021 Africa Cup of Nations.

References

External links
 
 

1993 births
Living people
Sudanese footballers
Sudan international footballers
Association football midfielders
Al-Hilal Club (Omdurman) players
Sudan Premier League players
2021 Africa Cup of Nations players
2022 African Nations Championship players
Sudan A' international footballers